Dyckia marnier-lapostollei is a plant species in the genus Dyckia, endemic to Brazil.

Two varieties are recognized:

Dyckia marnier-lapostollei var. estevesii Rauh - Minas Gerais
Dyckia marnier-lapostollei var. marnier-lapostollei - Minas Gerais, Goiás

Cultivars
 Dyckia 'Brian Chudleigh'
 Dyckia 'Warren'

References

marnier-lapostollei
Endemic flora of Brazil
Plants described in 1966